William Arthur Goodreds (3 November 1920 – 9 February 2014) was an English first-class cricketer born in Pensnett, Staffordshire who played in a single first-class match for Worcestershire against Cambridge University in 1952. He opened the bowling in both innings, but sent down only twelve overs in the game without taking a wicket; with the bat he scored 4 not out in his only innings.

References

External links
 

1920 births
2014 deaths
English cricketers
Worcestershire cricketers